Del Castillo may refer to: 

 Del Castillo (band), a Latin rock band from Texas
 Jorge Del Castillo (born 1950), Peruvian lawyer and politician
 Kate del Castillo, Mexican actress
 Mariano del Castillo (born 1949), Filipino judge
 Michel del Castillo (born 1933), French writer
 Pilar del Castillo (born 1952), Spanish politician

See also
 
 Del Castilho, a neighborhood in Rio de Janeiro, Brazil